William Godley (10 April 1880 – 1960) was an English footballer who played in the Football League for Middlesbrough and Stoke.

Career
Godley was born in Durham and played for South Bank before joining Middlesbrough in 1902. He played twice for "Boro" before joining Stoke where he played three times in 1904–05 scoring once against Grimsby Town in the FA Cup. He then went on to play for Plymouth Argyle, Reading, New Brompton and Darlington.

Career statistics
Source:

References

1880 births
1960 deaths
Sportspeople from Durham, England
Footballers from County Durham
English footballers
Association football forwards
South Bank F.C. players
Middlesbrough F.C. players
Stoke City F.C. players
Plymouth Argyle F.C. players
Reading F.C. players
Gillingham F.C. players
Darlington F.C. players
English Football League players